Andrew "Andy" Cohen (born March 16, 1965) is a three-time Emmy nominated independent filmmaker and journalist. The founder of AC Films Inc, Cohen has directed, written, and produced feature-length and short-form films. He produced and co-wrote his first film in 1996, Gaylen Ross' Dealers Among Dealers, about the New York City diamond business. Cohen would later co-write and produce Ross' 2008 documentary Killing Kasztner on the life and assassination of Rezso Kasztner.

Career
Cohen's work as a producer includes To Kill a Tiger (2022, Best Canadian Feature Film, Toronto International Film Festival), Ai Weiwei's Human Flow (2017, short-listed Academy Award for Best Documentary ®), Hooligan Sparrow (2016, short-listed Academy Award for Best Documentary ®),  Ai Weiwei: Never Sorry (2012, short-listed Academy Award for Best Documentary ®), and The World Before Her (2012, Best Documentary Feature, Tribeca Film Festival).

His work has been screened at festivals around the world, including the Venice Film Festival, Telluride, Tribeca Film Festival, Toronto International Film Festival, Berlin Film Festival, and Sundance Film Festival among others.

Cohen wrote and directed the documentary Ximei (2019 Movies that Matter Activist Award), which premiered at the International Film Festival and Forum on Human Rights in Geneva. Produced by Ai Weiwei, the film is centered around Liu Ximei, a Chinese peasant woman infected with AIDS during China’s Black Blood Economy in the 1990s.  Production of Ximei lasted seven years, due to interference from Chinese officials; Cohen's phone and internet messages were spied on and parts of footage were regularly confiscated.

Cohen also participated in Global Geneva's first ‘Youth Writes’ (Young Journalists and Writers Initiative) workshop in Versoix, Switzerland, in March 2019, helping high school students better understand the role of documentary film reporting.

His feature-length documentary, Beijing Spring (2021, Amnesty International / FIFA jury Award) chronicles China's first Democracy movement and protest demonstration for artistic freedom following China's brutal Cultural Revolution.

Crossing over from documentary to fiction, Cohen produced his first narrative feature, Little Death 2022, starring David Schwimmer, directed by Jack Begert, written by Dani Goffstein and Jack Begert, produced alongside Psycho Films and Darren Aronofsky’s Protozoa Pictures.

Filmography

 Dealers Among Dealers (1996) - producer
 Killing Kasztner (2008) - writer, producer     
 Ai Weiwei: Never Sorry (2012) - executive producer
 The World Before Her (2012) - executive producer
 Hooligan Sparrow (2016) - executive producer
 Human Flow (2017) - executive producer
 Ximei (2019) - writer, director, producer
 Beijing Spring (2020) - writer, director, producer
 To Kill a Tiger (2022)- executive producer, creative consultant
 Little Death (2022)- producer
 Our Universe (2022) - producer
 Village Gate (2023) - writer, director, producer

References

External links
 
 IMDb Profile
 Newswire Article: Human Flow
 ScreenDaily Write Up - Venice Film Festival
 Freedom: Short Film

American film producers
Living people
1965 births